Michelle de Kretser (born 1957) is an Australian novelist who was born in Sri Lanka (then Ceylon), and moved to Australia in 1972 when she was 14.

Education and literary career
De Kretser was educated at Methodist College, Colombo, and in Melbourne at Elwood College and Paris.

She worked as an editor for travel guides company Lonely Planet, and while on a sabbatical in 1999, wrote and published her first novel, The Rose Grower. Her second novel, published in 2003, The Hamilton Case was winner of the Tasmania Pacific Prize, the Encore Award (UK) and the Commonwealth Writers Prize (Southeast Asia and Pacific). Her third novel, The Lost Dog, was published in 2007. It was one of 13 books on the long list for the 2008 Man Booker Prize for fiction. From 1989 to 1992 she was a founding editor of the Australian Women's Book Review. Her fourth novel, Questions of Travel, won several awards, including the 2013 Miles Franklin Award, the Australian Literature Society Gold Medal (ALS Gold Medal), and the 2013 Prime Minister's Literary Awards for fiction. It was also shortlisted for the 2014 Dublin Impac Literary Award. Her 2017 novel, The Life to Come, was shortlisted for the 2018 Stella Prize, and won both the Miles Franklin Award and the Christina Stead Prize for Fiction.  This is the third time Michelle de Kretser has won this prize and equals Peter Carey's record of wins.

Awards
2004 – Encore Prize for The Hamilton Case
2004 – Commonwealth Writers' Prize, South-East Asia and the Pacific for The Hamilton Case
2005 – Tasmania Pacific Award for The Hamilton Case
2007 – Liberatur Award for The Hamilton Case
2008 – New South Wales Premier's Literary Awards – Christina Stead Prize for fiction and Book of the Year for The Lost Dog
2008 – ALS Gold Medal for The Lost Dog
2013 – Miles Franklin Award for Questions of Travel
2013 – ALS Gold Medal for Questions of Travel
2013 – Prime Minister's Literary Awards Fiction Prize for Questions of Travel
2013 – Western Australian Premier's Book Awards Fiction Prize and Premier's Prize for Questions of Travel
2014 – New South Wales Premier's Literary Awards – Christina Stead Prize for fiction and Book of the Year for Questions of Travel
2018 – Miles Franklin Award for The Life to Come
2019 – New South Wales Premier's Literary Awards – Christina Stead Prize for fiction for The Life to Come

Works 

 The Rose Grower (1999)
 The Hamilton Case (2003)
 The Lost Dog (2007)
 Questions of Travel (2012)
 Springtime (2014)
 The Life to Come (2017)
 On Shirley Hazzard (2019)
 Scary Monsters (2021)

References

External links 
 Interview
 Interview
 Man Booker longlist announced

1957 births
Living people
Sri Lankan emigrants to Australia
Miles Franklin Award winners
ALS Gold Medal winners
University of Melbourne alumni
Academic staff of the University of Melbourne
University of Melbourne women
Alumni of Methodist College, Colombo
20th-century Australian novelists
21st-century Australian novelists
20th-century Australian women writers
21st-century Australian women writers
Australian women novelists
Burgher people